Harry "Rube" Washington was an American Negro league pitcher between 1908 and 1911.

Washington made his Negro leagues debut in 1908 with the Indianapolis ABCs, and went on to play for the Cuban Stars (West), Kansas City Giants and Kansas City Royal Giants. In 13 recorded career appearances on the mound, he posted a 3.46 ERA over 96.1 innings.

References

External links
Baseball statistics and player information from Baseball-Reference Black Baseball Stats and Seamheads

Year of birth missing
Year of death missing
Place of birth missing
Place of death missing
Cuban Stars (West) players
Indianapolis ABCs players
Kansas City Giants players
Kansas City Royal Giants players